Euphaedra canui is a butterfly in the family Nymphalidae. It is found on Bioko, an island off the west coast of Africa.

References

Butterflies described in 1987
canui
Endemic fauna of Equatorial Guinea
Butterflies of Africa